Fast film may refer to:

Fast film, photographic film that is highly sensitive to light and can be recorded at high film speed
Fast Film (film), a 2003 film directed by Virgil Widrich